Andrew Chuma Agwunobi (born 1965) is an American physician and administrator. He has been the CEO for UConn Health since 2014 and was appointed interim president of the University of Connecticut on May 19, 2021. He is the first non-white person to serve as UConn president. 

On January 14, 2022, Agwunobi announced his resignation as interim president of UConn and CEO of UConn Health to work for Humana. His resignation took effect on February 20, 2022. Radenka Maric succeeded him as interim president.

Early life and education 
Agwunobi was born in Scotland in 1965 and raised in rural Scotland and Nigeria. His father, Titus Chukwuma Agwunobi, a surgeon, was an Igbo from Nigeria. His mother, Veronica Marie Stuart Shaw, a nurse, is of Scottish descent. They met while Titus Agwunobi was studying medicine at the University of St. Andrews. Both came from wealthy families, but their interracial marriage led to their parents disowning them.

A pediatrician by training, Andrew Agwunobi received an MD from the University of Jos in 1989 and completed his residency at the Howard University Hospital in Washington, D.C. He went on to earn an MBA from the Stanford Graduate School of Business in 2001.

Career 
Agwunobi has held various executive positions in healthcare administration, including chief executive officer (CEO) of the Grady Health System in Atlanta, president and CEO of the Tenet South Fulton Hospital in East Point, secretary of the Florida Agency for Health Care Administration, and CEO of Providence Healthcare in Spokane. He was a managing director of Berkeley Research Group and chief operating officer of the St. Joseph Health System in California. He has practiced medicine at Harvard Vanguard Medical Associates and the Palo Alto Medical Foundation.

In November 2014, Agwunobi became interim CEO at UConn Health. He became permanent CEO and executive vice president for health affairs in 2015. In this capacity, he oversaw the entire academic and clinical enterprise, including the John Dempsey Hospital, medical and dental schools, biomedical research, a business incubator, and over 5,000 employees. He presided over six consecutive years of revenue growth averaging 10% per year, oversaw $800 million of new construction, installed a new electronic health records system, and hired more than 180 faculty. As CEO, Agwunobi earned a salary of $709,000 in 2021. In 2018, state auditors faulted his approval of salary raises for UConn employees who signed off on a $563,000 contract with Berkeley Research Group, a consulting firm for which Agwunobi worked before he took over as interim CEO. The auditors said Agwunobi's action amounted to a "potential conflict of interest."

Following the resignation of Thomas C. Katsouleas only two years into his term as UConn's 16th president, UConn's Board of Trustees appointed Agwunobi interim president effective July 1, 2021. However, Agwunobi assumed the duties of president immediately after his appointment on May 19. He remained in his position as UConn Health CEO while serving as president.

In 2020, the Hartford Business Journal recognized Agwunobi as one of Hartford's "Power 25 in Healthcare." In 2007, Modern Healthcare named Agwunobi one of the "50 Most Powerful Physician Executives" in the United States. The Atlanta Business League named him CEO of the Year in 2005.

Personal life 
Agwunobi's elder brother is John O. Agwunobi, a fellow pediatrician and healthcare administrator who is the current CEO of Herbalife Nutrition. He formerly served as assistant secretary for health for the U.S. Department of Health and Human Services and secretary of the Florida Department of Health under Republican administrations.

Agwunobi is married to Elizabeth Nega, an Ethiopian-born physician of internal medicine. They met during his residency at Howard University. The couple have two teenage daughters, Hannah and Rebekah. Agwunobi's hobbies include reading classic books, archaeology, and writing.

Publications

References

External links 
 UConn Office of the President

Living people
1965 births
University of Jos alumni
Stanford Graduate School of Business alumni
Nigerian emigrants to the United States
Nigerian people of Scottish descent
American pediatricians
American health care chief executives
American people of Scottish descent
University of Connecticut people
Presidents of the University of Connecticut
21st-century African-American physicians
21st-century American physicians
20th-century African-American people